Lonneke Offenberg is a Dutch former cricketer who played as a batter. She appeared in one One Day International for the Netherlands in 1984, the team's first, against New Zealand. Batting at number 5, Offenberg scored 1 run in a 67 run defeat.

Offenberg also played for the Netherlands on their tours of England in 1981 and 1982, playing against various club and county sides, and in their Centenary Tournament in 1983.

References

External links

Date of birth missing (living people)
Year of birth missing (living people)
Place of birth missing (living people)
Living people
Dutch women cricketers
Netherlands women One Day International cricketers